Word-of-mouth marketing (WOMM, WOM marketing, also called word of mouth advertising) differs from naturally occurring word of mouth, in that it is actively influenced or encouraged by organizations (e.g. 'seeding' a message in a networks rewarding regular consumers to engage in WOM, employing WOM 'agents'). While it is difficult to truly control WOM, research has shown that there are three generic avenues to 'manage' WOM for the purpose of WOMM: 

 build a strong WOM foundation (e.g. sufficient levels of satisfaction, trust and commitment), 
 indirect WOMM management which implies that managers only have a moderate amount of control (e.g. controversial advertising, teaser campaigns, customer membership clubs), 
 direct WOMM management, which has higher levels of control (e.g. paid WOM 'agents', "friend get friend" schemes).

The success of word-of-mouth marketing depends largely on the nature of the rewards that are used. Research has shown that when the wrong incentives are used to motivate consumers or agents to spread positive word-of-mouth about products or brands, the campaigns can backfire on the organization. Proconsumer WOM has been suggested as a counterweight to commercially motivated word of mouth.

History
George Silverman, a psychologist, pioneered word-of-mouth marketing when he created what he called "teleconferenced peer influence groups" in order to engage physicians in dialogue about new pharmaceutical products.  Silverman noticed an interesting phenomenon while conducting focus groups with physicians in the early 1970s.  "One or two physicians who were having good experiences with a drug would sway an entire group of skeptics. They would even sway a dissatisfied group of ex-prescribers who had had negative experiences!"

With the emergence of Web 2.0, many web startups like Facebook, YouTube, MySpace, and Digg have used buzz marketing by merging it with the social networks that they have developed. With the increasing use of the Internet as a research and communications platform, word of mouth has become a more powerful and useful resource for consumers and marketers. It has become possible because, with the advent of the Internet, the process of communication has been simplified due to the disappearance of such communication barriers as distance, linguistic and others. People have become more willing to share their opinions, create thematic communities, which ultimately influenced the WOM.

In October 2005, the advertising watchdog group Commercial Alert petitioned the United States FTC to issue guidelines requiring paid word-of-mouth marketers to disclose their relationship and related compensation with the company whose product they are marketing. The United States FTC stated that it would investigate situations in which the relationship between the word-of-mouth marketer of a product and the seller is not revealed and could influence the endorsement.  The FTC stated that it would pursue violators on a case-by-case basis. Consequences for violators may include cease-and-desist orders, fines or civil penalties.

The Word of Mouth Marketing Association, a US American trade group that represents hundreds of companies, has adopted an ethics code stating that manufacturers should not pay cash to consumers in return for recommendations or endorsements.

Research firm PQ Media estimated that in 2008, companies spent $1.54 billion on word-of-mouth marketing. While spending on traditional advertising channels was slowing, spending on word-of-mouth marketing grew 14.2 percent in 2008, 30 percent of that for food and drink brands.

Word of mouth marketing today is both online and through face-to-face interaction. The Ehrenberg-Bass Institute for Marketing Science has shown that to achieve growth, brands must create word of mouth beyond core fan groups—meaning marketers should not focus solely on communities such as Facebook. According to Deloitte, further research has shown that 'most advocacy takes place offline'—instead it happens in person. According to the Journal of Advertising Research, 75% of all consumer conversations about brands happen face-to-face, 15% happen over the phone and just 10% online.  On the other hand, some see social media interaction as being inextricably tied to word of mouth marketing. In 2003, Fred Reichheld implemented the strategy of word-of-mouth marketing by introducing Net Promoter Score, which analyzes the number of Promoters a brand has, who recommend the brand to other people they know through such marketing tactic.

Factors 
According to academic research and Jonah Berger's bestselling book Contagious: Why Things Catch On, there are six key factors that drive what people talk about and share. They are organized in an acronym called STEPPS, which stands for:
 Social currency - The better something makes people look, the more likely they will be to share it.
 Triggers - Things that are top of mind (i.e., accessible) are more likely to be tip of tongue.
 Emotion - When we care, we share. High arousal emotions increase sharing.
 Public - The easier something is to see, the more likely people are to imitate it.
 Practical value - People share useful information to help others.
 Stories - Trojan horse stories carry messages and ideas along for the ride.

Another key psychological driver of word-of-mouth is interest.  As Sernovitz suggests, “nobody talks about boring companies, boring products, or boring ads,”.

Concepts/models

Three models
When further research went into developing the concept word-of-mouth marketing, many models behind the word of mouth strategy also developed. These models include the organic inter consumer influence model, the linear marketer influence model and the network coproduction model.

When dealing with the initial and simplest form of word of mouth Marketing it is related to the model of the organic inter-consumer influence model. This means that organizations having no direct input of what is being said about the particular product, it is just one consumer talking to another about product reviews and or customer service experience. The main motivation behind this model is for others to warn and inform potential consumers of a product out of their best interest not for personal gain. This model is referred to being organic because it occurs naturally, meaning it is not planned by the firm and occurs when the consumer wants to share their experience with a certain brand or product.

As research started to progress, marketers found the importance of "influential consumers". So the linear marketer influence model was adopted. The linear marketer influence model introduces the idea of influential customers creating conversations with potential customers and consumers about how a certain product can be beneficial for them to purchase. This model allows organizations to make sure that credible influential sources are spreading the word/ message of the organization and presenting the value proposition of the organization successfully and accurately to the target consumer. This can be done through "targeted advertisements and promotions through credible sources that review the product". Marketers found this model to be an effective model of word-of-mouth marketing and it decreased the chances of negative opinions and attitudes from being spread about a particular product of the organization.

The Network Coproduction Model: This saw marketers introduce "one to one seeding and communication programs". This model encourages conversations between customers about the certain product through releasing information on a particular product. This word-of-mouth model is more focused on online activities, using blogs and online communities as sources in communicating the message of the product. The network coproduction model gives marketers the opportunity to control and manage word of mouth activity online.

 Seeding is one example of how Marketers use the network coproduction model of word-of-mouth marketing. With seeding marketers can use various techniques and approaches these approaches can be indirect like engineering WOM conversations and direct approaches
 The engineering approach consists of marketers constructing conversations, so there is more buzz created and the number of conversations based on an organizations product increases.
 A direct approach to seeding is targeting special selected consumers and allowing them to sample products that an organization has. This allows these selected customers to present their feelings towards these products through online communities or blogs. 
 Seeding campaigns can offer marketers the ability to reach a new set of consumers. It is most effective when the product is at the beginning stage of its product life style and helps to set the reputation of the brand and product into motion.

Buzz
Marketing buzz or simply "buzz" is a term used in word-of-mouth marketing—the interaction of consumers and users of a product or service serve to amplify the original marketing message.  Some describe buzz as a form of hype among consumers, a vague but positive association, excitement, or anticipation about a product or service.  Positive "buzz" is often a goal of viral marketing, public relations, and of advertising on Web 2.0 media. The term refers both to the execution of the marketing technique, and the resulting goodwill that is created.  Examples of products with strong marketing buzz upon introduction were Harry Potter, the Volkswagen New Beetle, Pokémon, Beanie Babies, and the Blair Witch Project.

Viral effects
Viral marketing and viral advertising are buzzwords referring to marketing techniques that use pre-existing social networks to produce increases in brand awareness or to achieve other marketing objectives (such as product sales) through self-replicating viral processes, analogous to the spread of virus or computer viruses. It can be word-of-mouth delivered or enhanced by the network effects of the Internet. Viral promotions may take the form of video clips, interactive Flash games, advergames, ebooks, brandable software, images, or even text messages.  The goal of marketers interested in creating successful viral marketing programs is to identify individuals with high social networking potential (SNP) – and have a high probability of being taken by another competitor—and create viral messages that appeal to this segment of the population.  The term "viral marketing" has also been used pejoratively to refer to stealth marketing campaigns—the unscrupulous use of astroturfing on-line combined with undermarket advertising in shopping centers to create the impression of spontaneous word-of-mouth enthusiasm.

Analyzing WOM   
Consumers may promote brands by word-of-mouth due to social, functional, and emotional factors. 
Research has identified thirteen brand characteristics that stimulate WOM, namely:

 Age of the brand in the marketplace: A long history of a brand or product can create an emotional relationship between the consumer and itself. This can stimulate WOM if the brand is known to be reliable or effective evident by the existence of its place in a market, this can be effective for companies for communicating their strength to other competitors.
 Type of good: Depending on the type of product, experiences customers have with a product may mean that WOM can be used to suggest brands and products to others when in different forms of situations. An example of this could be a household or garden object.
 Complexity: WOM is used in this instance to help explain the use of a product or its effectiveness to whether of not it will serve its purpose or need.
 Knowledge about a brand: Similar to complexity, WOM can be used to describe the effectiveness of a brand, the history behind it and what the main purpose of the product is. WOM is also used to identify a company's future whether it be positive or negative.
 Differentiation: An experience with different products within a market can mean that WOM can offer solutions to others and explain which products and brands could be more effective than others when looking at similar products serving the same need. Previous consumers can help describe strengths and weaknesses of products and help make the correct decision.
 Relevance of a brand to a broad audience
 Quality: esteem given to a brand
 Premium: WOM regarding premiums can refer too different packaging of a brands products e.g. during Easter or over Christmas. Different and exciting packaging and deals can stimulate a huge source of WOM communication and can lead to brands becoming extremely popular over short periods of time. An example of this would be supermarket 'bulk buy' deals over the Christmas holiday period.
 Visibility
 Excitement: WOM can be used to promote up and coming products which results in huge amounts of excitement. An example of this could be new technology being released to the public and advances in medical technology and vehicles. These examples are best used to demonstrate excitement as a result of word of mouth marketing.
 Satisfaction
 Perceived risk: WOM can be used to warn other potential buyers that a product is not what it claims to be. An example of this may be online buying as a result of marketing strategies from phony companies who focus on producing fake goods that look and seem like the legitimate product. An example of this would be fake iPhones and clothing (most significantly shoes and sports wear).
 Involvement

This research also found that while social and functional drivers are the most important for promotion via WOM online, the emotional driver predominates offline.

Advantages and disadvantages
Word of mouth marketing can be very effective in the communication of the advertising campaign as it can offer a solution to "penetrating consumers guards" to get them talking about a particular product.

Many marketers find this type of marketing strategy advantageous to the entire advertising campaign of a certain product. One positive aspect of this marketing strategy is that sources of this word-of-mouth advertising are mostly personal. This means that they are not subject to persuasion from the organization for personal gains or subject to being biased. This has a positive effect on the advertising campaign as it shows what consumers honestly think about a product and the motivation to try the particular product or services increases, due to the consumer being recommended by a trusted reliable source.

However, there are some disadvantages and criticisms with word-of-mouth marketing. Word-of-mouth marketing is subject to a lot of clutter. Unlike traditional word of mouth, electronic WOM is able to include not only positive reviews but also negative reviews made by former, actual and potential customers online in a timely manner. As a result, word-of-mouth marketing may sometimes not be beneficial in changing or influencing consumer's attitudes and perception especially from an organic source as negative conversations may be held about the brand. This is due to the organic source not finding the product beneficial and therefore has a negative perception of the product, which is then shared. Although positive word-of-mouth positively influences purchase intention while negative word-of-mouth decreases customer purchase intention, the effect is asymmetric. Compared with positive word-of-mouth, negative word-of-mouth has a larger effect on purchase intentions.

One more criticism about this marketing strategy is that people tend to be offput and feel deceived when they find out that a person who influenced their attitude about a product has been working towards or benefiting from doing that. This ultimately has the potential to make consumers change their attitude, which can have a negative impact on the firm's product reputation. This may be the case as consumers feel that it wasn't in the source's interest to tell what their full perceptions were of the brand. Similarly, engineered word of mouth by internet-campaigns companies can be seen as artificial and sometime based on information considered private.

See also

 Social media marketing
 Two-step flow of communication
 Evangelism marketing
Viral marketing
Marketing buzz
Guerrilla marketing
User-generated content
Online Brand Defense - A type of consumer behavior that has been considered creating significant impact on Word-of-mouth

References

  

Advertising techniques
Marketing techniques
Promotion and marketing communications